The women's 100 metres at the 2012 African Championships in Athletics was held at the Stade Charles de Gaulle on 27 and 28 June.

Medalists

Records

Schedule

Results

Round 1
First 4 in each heat (Q) and 4 best performers (q) advance to the Semifinals.

Wind:Heat 1: -1.6 m/s, Heat 2: -3.2 m/s, Heat 3: -3.1 m/s, Heat 4: -2.2 m/s, Heat 5: -2.1 m/s

Semifinals
First 2 in each heat (Q) and 2 best performers (q) advance to the Final.

Wind:Heat 1: -0.1 m/s, Heat 2: 0.0 m/s, Heat 3: 0.0 m/s

Final
Wind: -0.8 m/s

References

Results

100 Women
100 metres at the African Championships in Athletics
2012 in women's athletics